Giovanni Battista Guadagnini (often shortened to G. B. Guadagnini; 23 June 1711 – 18 September 1786) was an Italian luthier, regarded as one of the finest craftsmen of string instruments in history. He is widely considered the third greatest maker after Antonio Stradivari and Giuseppe Guarneri "del Gesù". The Guadagnini family was known for their violins, guitars and mandolins.

Biography
Giovanni Battista Guadagnini was born on June 23, 1711 in the hamlet of Bilegno, in what is now the Province of Piacenza in Northern Italy. Both his life and his career can be divided into four distinct periods, which correspond to the four cities in which he would live and work, Piacenza, Milan, Parma, and Turin.
 
Almost nothing is known about his early years until he moved to the nearby city of Piacenza in 1738. In 1742, his first violins start to appear. It is unclear from whom or where he learned his trade. Since he joined the woodworking guild, it is likely that he underwent an apprenticeship with a local woodworker; however, there is no evidence of any local instrument makers in Piacenza at the time.

In 1749 Guadagnini moved to Milan, where he continued to make instruments. The reason for his move is unknown, but was perhaps economically motivated as Milan was a much larger city with a larger and more active music scene. During this time a few of his instruments bear labels implying a relationship to Cremona—the home of the renowned violin makers Amati, Stradivari, and Guarneri—however no evidence exists that Guadagnini ever lived in Cremona.

In 1758 Guadagnini moved again, this time to Parma. He may have been drawn to the city by the recent appointment of Carlo Ferarri, a close musician friend from his time in Piacenza, to a position with the Ducal Court. During his time in Parma Guadagnini was also closely connected to the court, and in particular to the musical patronage of the Prime Minister Guillaume du Tillot. In his later years in Parma Guadagnini even received a direct salary from the court. In 1771, with the Court's financial fortunes in decline, Guadagnini asked to be allowed to leave.

He next moved to Turin. Two years later, in 1773, he began his historically important relationship with notable violin collector Count Cozio. Cozio purchased most, if not all, of Guadagnini's output during this time, and also supplied him with most of his wood and other materials. His business partnership with Cozio ended in 1777, though they continued to have dealings with each other. The Count is likely responsible for Guadagnini's marked shift to a more Stradivari-like style during this time, both by pressuring Guadagnini to more closely copy Stradivari and by providing Guadagnini with access to examples of Stradivari's work.

Giovanni Battista Guadagnini passed away in Turin on September 18, 1786.

Violin maker 
Guadagnini's work is divided into four distinct periods, which correspond to the four cities in which he worked over the span of his career, Piacenza, Milan, Parma, and Turin. His work in each new city changed in response to the availability of materials, the needs of the local musicians, and finally in Turin, his relationship with Count Cozio. Stylistically Guadagnini's work is generally less refined and polished than that of makers such as the Amatis or Stradivari, however with the same focus on tonal success. He is generally considered to be the last of the great historical makers, ranking just behind Stradivari and Guarneri. He is also possibly the last of historical makers to have used a varnish similar to what was used by classical Cremonese makers.

His instruments have sold for over $2,000,000 at auction.

Performers with Guadagnini instruments

Violinists

 Violists
 Li-Kuo Chang plays the 'ex-Vieuxtemps' G.B. Guadagnini viola, Parma c.1768.
 Geraldine Walther plays a G.B. Guadagnini viola, Turin 1774.

 Cellists
 Nicolas Altstaedt plays a G.B. Guadagnini cello made in 1749 (body size: 70 centimeters)
 Natalie Clein plays the "Simpson" Guadagnini cello (1777).
 Kristina Reiko Cooper plays the “ex-Havemeyer” Guadagnini cello made in 1743.
 David Geringas plays a G.B. Guadagnini cello made in 1761.
 Maxine Neuman plays a 1772 Guadagnini.
 Han-na Chang plays the G.B. Guadagnini cello made in Milan in 1757.
 Gilberto Munguia plays a G.B. Guadagnini cello (1748).
 Saša Večtomov played a G.B. Guadagnini cello made in Milan in 1754.
 Sol Gabetta plays a G.B. Guadagnini cello (1759).
 Carter Brey, principal cellist of the New York Philharmonic Orchestra, plays a Guadagnini made in Milan in 1754.

 Groups
 Australian String Quartet (ASQ) plays four matched instruments: a violoncello (c.1743), and a violin (1748–49), both made in Piacenza, and a viola (1783) and another violin (1784) made in Turin.

References

Bibliography

Cozio Archive Giovanni Batista Guadagnini.

External links

""Bach es un horizonte de infinitas posibilidades" . Archived from Diario de Sevilla on 12 Marzo, 2021.

1711 births
1786 deaths
Italian luthiers
People from Piacenza